Sten Ove Eike (born 8 October 1981) is a former Norwegian football forward, who played for Haugesund most of his career.

Career
Eike was born in Skudenes, and played for the local club Skudenes UIL before he joined Haugesund in 2004.

Eike suffered from a heart attack after a match against Stavanger on 27 September 2009, but he made his comeback in the 2011 Tippeligaen. He played 124 matches and scored 20 goals for Haugesund.

On 15 August 2011, Eike signed a half-year contract with the 1. divisjon club Sandefjord. With the help of Eike's six goals in nine matches, Sandefjord came third in 2011 Norwegian First Division, but missed out on the promotion to Tippeligaen. After the season, he decided to step down from the professional football career, and got a job as director of football and janitor in his youth club Skudenes, but he admitted that he would probably play some matches for the team in the Norwegian Fifth Division. Until 2017 he played some Skudenes games every season, being a prolific goalscorer.

Career statistics 

Source:

References

External links
100% Fotball player statistics 

1981 births
Living people
People from Karmøy
Norwegian footballers
FK Haugesund players
Sandefjord Fotball players
Norwegian First Division players
Eliteserien players
Association football forwards
Sportspeople from Rogaland